Virtual address refers to an address identifying a virtual, i.e. non-physical, entity. For example:
 Virtual address space in computing
 Virtual address translation to physical address in computing
 Virtual postal address, see virtual mailbox or commercial mail receiving agency
 Virtual business address, see Virtual office

See also
 Virtual (disambiguation)